Jason Kliot (born 1963) is an American independent film producer based in New York. Kliot emerged with the American indie wave of the 1990s, producing alongside his wife and business partner Joana Vicente. In 1995 Kliot and Vicente associate produced Todd Solondz's feature debut, Welcome to the Dollhouse, which won the Sundance Grand Jury Prize. Kliot and Vicente have since worked with directors such as Steven Soderbergh, Brian De Palma, Hal Hartley, Nicole Holofcener, Jim Jarmusch, and Alex Gibney.

Kliot was also one of the founders of City Harvest, the first food redistribution organization in the United States. He now serves on the Board of City Harvest.

In 2010 Kliot was a jury member at the Sundance Film Festival.

Open City Films
Kliot and Vicente are co-founders and presidents of Open City Films, a production company of feature films and documentaries with an acclaimed catalogue of films including Three Seasons, Enron: The Smartest Guys in the Room, Coffee and Cigarettes, Redacted, The Assassination of Richard Nixon, Welcome to the Dollhouse and Awake. Throughout the years, their films have been nominated for 23 Independent Spirit Awards- four have won. Enron: The Smartest Guys in the Room, also garnered a nomination for Best Documentary Picture at the 78th Academy Awards in 2008. Their films have also been selected numerous times for the Cannes, Berlin, Venice, and Toronto film festivals and have garnered four winning trophies at The Sundance Film Festival.

Blow Up Pictures
In 1998, Kliot and Vicente founded Blow Up Pictures, the first digital production company in the United States. Their first film, Chuck & Buck, was the first digital film produced and distributed in the US. It premiered at the Sundance Film Festival and was nominated for five Independent Spirit Awards in 2001. Under the Blow Up banner, Jason and Joana also produced such films as Lovely and Amazing, Series 7: The Contenders and Love In the Time of Money.

HDNet Films
In 2003, Kliot and Vicente co-founded HDNet Films with Mark Cuban and Todd Wagner.  The company produced 18 films in five years, all shot on digital video. The HDNet Films production of Steven Soderbergh's  Bubble  was the first film ever to be released "day-and-date," in the United States, simultaneously opening across theatrical, cable and satellite television,  and home video platforms. This innovative distribution strategy allowed consumers to choose how, when and where they wished to see a film.

Films produced under HDNet include Academy-Award nominated Enron: The Smartest Guys in the Room, and Redacted, which took the Silver Lion at the 2007 Venice Film Festival.

Awards and nominations
 2007 "Made in NY" Award, conferred by Mayor Michael Bloomberg and the New York Office of Film, Television, and Broadcasting
 2006 Academy-Award nomination, Best Feature Length Documentary for Enron: The Smartest Guys in the Room
 2000 Independent Spirit Award nomination, Best First Feature for Three Seasons

Filmography as producer
  (2009)
  (2008)
  (2008)
  (2008)
  (2007)
  (2007)
  (2007)
  (2007)
  (2007)
  (2006)
  (2006)
  (2006)
  (2006)
  (2006)
  (2005)
  (2005)
  (2005)
  (2005)
  (2004)
  (2004)
  (2004)
  (2003)
  (2002)
  (2002)
  (2002)
  (2001)
  (2001)
  (2001)
  (2001)
  (2000)
  (2000)
  (1999)
  (1999)
  (1999)
  (1998)
  (1997)
 Chocolate Babies (1997)
  (1997)
  (1997)
  (1997)
  (1996)
  (1996)
  (1996)
  (1996)
  (1995)
 (1994)
  (1991)

References

External links
 

1963 births
American film producers
Living people
Amherst College alumni
People from New York (state)